The FIBA Oceania Championship for Men 2001 was the qualifying tournament of FIBA Oceania for the 2002 FIBA World Championship. New Zealand won the series 2-1 to claim its second Oceania Championship and first championship that Australia also participated in.

Teams that did not enter

Results

 New Zealand qualified for the 2002 FIBA World Championship.

External links
 FIBA Archive

FIBA Oceania Championship
Championship
2001 in New Zealand basketball
2001–02 in Australian basketball
International basketball competitions hosted by New Zealand
Australia men's national basketball team games
New Zealand men's national basketball team games